is located in the Southern Yatsugatake Volcanic Group of the Yatsugatake Mountains, Honshū, Japan.

References
 Geographical Survey Institute

Yoko
Yoko